The Roman Catholic Diocese of Bangassou is a suffragan diocese in the Central African Republic in the Ecclesiastical province of Bangui.  The diocese is dependent on the missionary Dicastery for Evangelization.

Its cathedral episcopal see is Cathédrale Saint Pierre Claver, dedicated to Jesuit Saint Peter Claver, in Bangassou, Mbomou prefecture.

History 
 Established on 14 June 1954 as Apostolic Prefecture of Bangassou, on territory split off from the Apostolic Vicariate of Bangui, its future Metropolitan
 Promoted to Diocese of Bangassou on 10 February 1964 as a suffragan of the Archdiocese of Bangui.
 Lost territory on 18 December 2004 to establish the Diocese of Alindao.

Statistics 
As per 2020, the diocese pastorally served 82,500 Catholics (14.2% of 582,500 total population) on 134,284 km2 in 14 parishes with 28 priests (24 diocesan, 4 religious), 13 lay religious (5 male, 8 female) and 10 seminarians.

Ordinaries
(all Roman rite, so far European members of Latin congregations)

Apostolic Prefect of Bangassou
 Father Martin Bodewes, Holy Ghost Fathers (C.S.Sp.) (4 March 1955 – 10 February 1964)

Bishops of Bangassou 
 Antoine Marie Maanicus, C.S.Sp. (10 February 1964 – 21 December 2000)
 Juan-José Aguirre Muñoz, Comboni Missionaries (M.C.C.J.) (21 December 2000 - Present), former Coadjutor Bishop of Bangassou (13 December 1997 – 21 December 2000)

Auxiliary Bishop
Jesús Ruiz Molina, M.C.C.J., Titular Bishop of Aræ in Mauretania (11 July 2017 – 10 March 2021), Appointed, Bishop of Mbaïki.

Other priest of this diocese who became bishop
Cyr-Nestor Yapaupa (priest in diocese from 18 March 2001 to 18 December 2004), appointed Coadjutor Bishop of Alindao in 2012

See also 
 List of Roman Catholic dioceses in the Central African Republic
 Roman Catholicism in the Central African Republic

Sources and external links 
 GCatholic.org - data for all sections

Roman Catholic dioceses in the Central African Republic
Roman Catholic Ecclesiastical Province of Bangui
Religious organizations established in 1954
Roman Catholic dioceses and prelatures established in the 20th century
Bangassou
Mbomou
1954 establishments in Africa